The Montreal Institute for Genocide and Human Rights Studies (MIGS) is a research institute based at Concordia University in Montreal, Quebec, Canada. It was founded in 1986 and promotes human rights awareness, in the field of genocide and mass atrocities by hosting frequent events, publishing policy briefs, engaging in counter activism on the web, and many other programs. Its keystone project is the Will to Intervene (W2I) Project which, under the advisement of Lt. General Roméo Dallaire and MIGS' Director Frank Chalk, builds domestic political will in Canada and the United States to prevent future mass atrocities.

About 
The Montreal Institute for Genocide and Human Rights Studies (MIGS) is recognized internationally as Canada’s leading research and advocacy Institute for genocide and mass atrocity crimes prevention, MIGS conducts in-depth scholarly research and proposes concrete policy recommendations to resolve conflicts before they degenerate into mass atrocity crimes. MIGS has achieved national and international recognition for its national interest approach to the prevention of genocide and mass atrocity crimes from policymakers, academics, leading research institutes, and the media. Today, MIGS is Canada’s leading voice and international partner on Responsibility to Protect issues.

Mission 
MIGS has the following stated goals:
 Develop major research programs focusing on the prevention and punishment of genocide and other mass atrocity crimes.
 Collect and disseminate research results to specialist professionals and to the wider public.
 Create and advocate for innovative public policies to prevent future mass atrocities.
 Educate students, academics, journalists, government officials, civil society groups, and the wider public on threats to the national interest arising from genocide and mass atrocity crimes.
 Provide professional training and build mass atrocity awareness and prevention capacity of international and national leaders in key fields
 Develop and foster fruitful relationships and networks at the local, national and international levels by working in collaboration with leading organizations, institutions and research institutes.

History 
The institute was founded by Dr Frank Chalk, a professor in the history department, and the late Dr Kurt Jonassohn in 1986. The institute’s current focus is on its Will to Intervene Project, which is led by Kyle Matthews, a former Canadian diplomat, and MIGS' current Senior Deputy Director. Lt. Gen (retired) The Honourable Roméo Dallaire has been a Senior Fellow at MIGS since 2006 and cofounded the W2I Project. MIGS also has a large number of interns who assist with MIGS' initiatives and projects. In recent years, Concordia faculty members and graduate students from Communications, English, Geography, and Political Science have joined in its work, as have colleagues from McGill and the University of Quebec in Montreal.

MIGS develops and manages major research programs focused on the prevention of genocide and crimes against humanity, educates comparatively about genocide, the Responsibility to protect, and helps survivors and their children end their isolation by building bridges with other survivors of genocide and mass atrocity crimes.

Drawing on its research, MIGS aims to further understandings of the history, sociology and international legal frameworks pertaining to genocide, crimes against humanity, and reconciliation in their wake. MIGS advances these goals by organising workshops and conferences, sponsoring lectures, issuing reports, preparing books and articles, and training students who specialise in genocide studies at undergraduate, masters and doctoral levels. MIGS works locally, nationally and internationally to educate members of the public, the media, and government.

Initiatives and projects
Over the years, MIGS has developed a number of research initiatives and projects which aim to collect and disseminate knowledge about the historical origins of mass killings, and seeking to prevent future atrocities of this kind. The staff also produce a number of articles fitting within the scope of each project.

Will to Intervene (W2I) 
The Will to Intervene Project (W2I) is MIGS primary project. It was started by Director Frank Chalk and Lt. General Roméo Dallaire as an effort to create domestic building domestic political will in Canada and the United States to prevent future mass atrocities. It also aims to understand how to mobilize domestic political will in order to prevent or halt genocide and mass atrocities.

The W2I team works to advance public policy on mass atrocity crimes prevention through the education and training of policymakers, elected officials, diplomats, journalists and civil society groups. W2I organises conferences, policy briefings, specialized training sessions and civic dialogues to generate awareness and understanding of what policies can be put in place to make "never again" a reality.

W2I's ground-breaking 2009 policy report, Mobilizing The Will To Intervene: Leadership and Action to Prevent Mass Atrocities, contains concrete policy recommendations for the governments of Canada and of the United States, as well as recommendations for journalists and civil society groups, which will advance this goal. Based on 80 interviews carried out with high level Canadian and American policymakers it details the long term consequences to Canadian and American security, public health and prosperity that result from mass atrocities, which make engaging in the prevention of such atrocities in each county's national interest. It was later published as a book in 2010 by McGill-Queens University Press.

Digital Mass Atrocity (DMAP) Lab 
The Digital Mass Atrocity Prevention Lab (DMAP Lab) is a policy hub working to combat genocidal ideologies online and work as a counter force against extremists and their ideas. Modern social media enables terrorist groups to disseminate propaganda, advertise their crimes, incite violence, radicalize and persuade disenfranchised young adults to join their hateful cause. The project asks what governments, international organizations, civil society groups and individual citizens can do to counter online extremism as the fight against religious extremism increasingly takes place in cyberspace.

Goals of the DMAP Lab 
 Analyze key actors and drivers of online extremism and radicalization
 Develop tools and strategies to counter extremists who use social media and other digital technologies as a weapon of war
 Propose policy recommendations to governments, NGOs, UN agencies and other stakeholders
 Provide specialized training and policy advice
 Bring together policymakers, journalists, academics, tech expects, human rights activists and community leaders to create a global network as a force for good

Media Monitoring Project 
The Media Monitoring Project is intended to provide early warnings of genocide, crimes against humanity, ethnic cleansing, and serious war crimes by monitoring the domestic news media (newspapers, radio, television and online sources) in at-risk countries. It also seeks to inform policy makers, academics, NGO workers and students about what government-owned media in countries at risk tell their people in their own language. In order to get the best understanding of the situation and provide an overall account of what the people on the ground are being told, the project covers both government-owned and privately owned domestic media.

This project monitors the domestic media, both government owned and privately owned, in high priority countries such as Sudan, Cote d'Ivoire, Somalia and the Democratic Republic of Congo in order to act as an early warning system to help prevent genocide and mass atrocity crimes.

Professional Training Program on the Prevention of Mass Atrocities 
Organized in cooperation with the Human Rights Research and Education Centre, this program is tailored to mid- to senior-level professionals interested in the prevention and interdiction of mass atrocity crimes. It is a two to three day conference, which includes workshops, guest speakers and panel discussions. The training program is divided into several thematic sessions presented by internationally recognized experts in the field of human rights and international affairs,

Aim of the program 
 Providing participants with opportunities to deepen their knowledge
 Providing participants with opportunities to hone their skills through training sessions on topics including international law, the Responsibility to Protect, Boko Haram, child soldiers, and humanitarian affairs. MIGS works with instructors from the Child Soldiers Initiative, the Canadian Parliament, the Canadian Forces, and more
 Providing participants with networking opportunities to expand their contacts, to identify new partnerships, and to broaden their knowledge
 Encouraging participants to consider the intersection of their work with other human rights issues

The Raoul Wallenberg Legacy of Leadership Project 
With funding from the Swedish Institute (Svenska Institutet), MIGS organized a series of events to increase awareness among youth and the general public about the Swedish diplomat Raoul Wallenberg, who is accredited with rescuing the lives of up to one hundred thousand Jews during the Second World War in Budapest, Hungary.

Memoirs of Holocaust survivors in Canada 
The project to collect unpublished diaries and memoirs written by Holocaust survivors in Canada was initiated some years ago by Professors Mervin Butovsky and Kurt Jonassohn. They thought it important that these documents be preserved as a valuable part of the historical record because their contents would differ in significant ways from interview testimonies. Some of these differences are explored in a paper.

The collected manuscripts were deposited in the Archives of Concordia University with the addition of an abstract and a list of key words with explanations. The location of towns and villages was ascertained by consulting standard reference works. The location of camps was facilitated by consulting Weinmann who identifies over 2,000 camps. These memoirs are now accessible to interested scholars by consulting the Concordia University Archives.

The abstracts and key words of all of the manuscripts collected to date are available.

References

External links 

 Official website

Concordia University
Genocide education
Human rights organizations based in Canada
Organizations based in Montreal
Roméo Dallaire
Responsibility to protect
Genocide prevention
Genocide research and prevention organisations